Smolenski or Smoleński (Polish feminine: Smoleńska; plural: Smoleńscy) is a surname. Notable people with this surname include:

 Anna Smoleńska (1920–1943), Polish WWII resistance member
 Dionizy Smoleński (1902–1984), Polish scientist
 Don Smolenski, American businessman
 John Smolenski (historian) (born 1973), American historian
 John Smolenski (Brooklyn) (1891–1953), American politician
 Józef Smoleński (1894–1978), Polish general
 Martin Smolenski (born 2003), Bulgarian footballer
 Piotr Smoleński (died 1942), Polish cryptologist
 Tadeusz Samuel Smoleński (1884–1909), Polish Egyptologist
 Władysław Smoleński (1851–1926), Polish historian

See also
 
 Smolensky (surname)

Bulgarian-language surnames
Polish-language surnames